Cala Pada is a beach on the south east seaboard of the Spanish island of Ibiza.

Description
Cala Pada beach is a broad sandy stretch of beach backed by a wood of pine and juniper trees. The offshore reefs protect the bay from the sea, making it popular with the island's windsurfers when the south wind blows. From the beach there are views to several small offshore islands including Illa de Santa Eulària, Illa Rodona and En Caragoler.

Illa Rodona
On 17 January 1913. a steamship called the SS Mallorca ran aground on a reef around Illa Rodona. The crew and passengers were rescued from the ship by the local fishermen of Santa Eulària des Riu. There is a stone memorial to commemorate the rescue in front of the Ajuntament (town hall) in the plaçe d' Espanya, Santa Eulària des Riu.

External links
 for SS Mallorca Shipwreck details

Gallery

References

Beaches of Ibiza
Beaches of the Balearic Islands